The Hilltop Reservation is a nature preserve located in Essex County, New Jersey, in the host communities of Caldwell, Cedar Grove, North Caldwell and Verona. It is composed of lands formerly occupied by the Essex Mountain Sanatorium, a hospital center originally constructed in the early 1900s to treat tuberculosis patients.

Hilltop Reservation is located on the Second Watchung Mountain, one of three Watchung Mountains which are long, low ridges of volcanic origin in northern New Jersey.

History 

The land was designated a Conservation Easement in 2001 by the New Jersey Department of Environmental Protection, permanently dedicating it for conservation and passive recreation purposes, and thereby protecting it from any future development.

Hilltop Conservancy 

The Hilltop Conservancy is a local group dedicated to the preservation of this area.

References

External links 
Hilltop Conservancy

Protected areas of Essex County, New Jersey
Watchung Mountains